Kagat ng Dilim is a Philippine horror-drama anthology television series that is produced by Viva Television and premiered on Intercontinental Broadcasting Corporation (IBC) from June 10, 2000, ran until 2002 and later revived on TV5 since November 27, 2020.

See also
 Kapatid Channel
 List of programs broadcast by TV5 (Philippine TV network)
 List of programs previously broadcast by Intercontinental Broadcasting Corporation

References

External links
 

Philippine anthology television series
2000 Philippine television series debuts
2002 Philippine television series endings
2020 Philippine television series debuts
2020s Philippine television series
Intercontinental Broadcasting Corporation original programming
TV5 (Philippine TV network) original programming
Filipino-language television shows
Philippine horror fiction television series
Television series revived after cancellation
Television series by Viva Television
Television series by Cignal Entertainment